"Imagination" is a 2008 song American musician Jes, who co-wrote the track with her partners from Motorcycle, Josh Gabriel and Dave Dresden and co-produced it with Richard Robson. The track is featured on her 2007 debut studio album Disconnect and a chill-out version is on her 2008 compilation album Into the Dawn (The Hits Disconnected).

The track itself is a newly recorded version of an original that was recorded in 2004 as a Motorcycle single when Brieden was still a member. It has also been featured as a track on Tiësto's In Search of Sunrise 6 mixed compilation set, and in an acoustic version on Gabriel & Dresden's album Bloom.

"Imagination" reached number 1 on Billboard Dance Radio Airplay in January 2009.

In 2019, Will Atkinson remixed Imagination. The track was released via Magik Muzik (Black Hole Recordings).

CD, Maxi Singles

Magik Muzik Maxi-single 
Imagination (Tiësto Radio Edit) - 3:45
Imagination (Tiësto Remix) - 7:23
Imagination (Kaskade Radio Edit) - 3:46
Imagination (Kaskade Club Remix) - 6:35
Imagination (Michael Moog Remix) - 7:37
Imagination (Piano Vocal Ballad) - 3:31

Ultra Records LP Cut 
Imagination (Richard Robson Remix)

Chart positions
Hot Dance Airplay: #1

See also
List of number-one dance airplay hits of 2009 (U.S.)

References

2008 singles
Songs written by Josh Gabriel
2008 songs
Ultra Music singles
Jes (musician) songs
House music songs